Ceres is a dwarf planet in the asteroid belt that lies between the orbits of Mars and Jupiter. The IAU has adopted two themes for naming surface features on Ceres: agricultural deities for craters and agricultural festivals for everything else.

As of 2020, the IAU has approved names for 151 geological features on Ceres: craters, montes, catenae, rupēs, plana, tholi, planitiae, fossae and sulci. In July 2018, NASA released a comparison of physical features found on Ceres with similar ones present on Earth.

Piazzi, named after Giuseppe Piazzi, the discoverer of Ceres, is a dark region southwest of Dantu crater in ground-based images that was named before Dawn arrived at Ceres.

Overview of features

Catenae

Craters 
Ceres is saturated with impact craters. Many have a central pit or bright spot.

In the first batch of 17 names approved by the IAU, craters north of 20° north latitude had names beginning with A–G (with Asari being the furthest north), those between 20° north and south latitude beginning with H–R, and those further south beginning with S–Z (with Zadeni being the furthest south).

Faculae (bright spots) 

A few of the brightest faculae were numbered during the approach of the Dawn spacecraft.

Fossae

Labes

Labyrinthus

Montes

Plana

Planitiae 
The three planitiae may be large and largely obliterated craters.

Regiones

Rupēs

Sulci

Tholi

Notes

References